Zegers is a Dutch-language and German-language patronymic surname (son of Zeger). 

Notable persons with the name Zegers or variant Zeegers include:

 Afrodite Zegers (born 1991),  Greek born Dutch competitive sailor
 Antonia Zegers (born 1972), Chilean actress
 Gerard Zegers (1591–1651), Flemish painter, art collector and art dealer
 Isidora Zegers (1803–1869), Spanish artist and composer
 Jacobus Zegers (died 1644), printer in Leuven
 Jacques Zegers (born 1947), Belgian singer
 Kevin Zegers (born 1984), Canadian actor
 Kristoffer Zegers (born 1973), Dutch composer
 Margriet Zegers (born 1954), Dutch field hockey player
 Nicholas Tacitus Zegers ( 1495–1559), Flemish biblical exegete
Zeegers
 Bram Zeegers (1949–2007), Dutch lawyer
 Guus Zeegers (1906–1978), Dutch middle-distance runner
 Jan Zeegers (1902–1978), Dutch middle-distance runner

See also
 Segers
 Seghers
 Seegers

Dutch-language surnames
Patronymic surnames